The "Sharks" were the Royal Navy's Helicopter Display Team from 1975 to 1992.  They initially flew six red Westland Gazelle helicopters, with aircraft and pilots drawn from 705 Naval Air Squadron based at RNAS Culdrose, Cornwall. After a mid-air collision between two aircraft in June 1977, the team size was reduced to four aircraft.

History
The "Sharks" were established in 1975 and were unusual in that the team's personnel and crews were changed every year.  The pilots were all instructors from 705 NAS, which at the time was the squadron responsible for the basic training of Royal Navy helicopter pilots. Their involvement with the "Sharks" was purely voluntary, and all the activities involved with the team - the pre-season rehearsals, transits to and from display venues, and the display flying itself - were in addition to their normal weekday duties instructing student pilots on the Westland Gazelle.

The "Sharks" display routine was renowned for mixing together a range of different manoeuvres, comprising close formation, synchronised, opposition and solo flying.  The display typically lasted for 10-12 minutes, and was highlighted by the use of distinctive mix of red and green smoke.

The team operated successfully for the best part of two decades, appearing at airshows and events around the UK and near Europe.  They were regulars at the largest shows such as the International Air Tattoo, Farnborough Airshow, as well as Royal Navy-organised events and the British Grand Prix.

Disbandment
The team were disbanded in 1992 due to Royal Navy operational and budgetary commitments. Despite this, the Royal Navy Helicopter Display Team title was maintained until the end of 1996 as 705 NAS continued to provide a pair of Gazelles known simply as the "Gazelle Pair" (although in 1995 a special four-aircraft team was resurrected for a handful of events).  With the retirement of the Gazelle from Royal Navy service, the Royal Navy Helicopter Display Team was finally disbanded in 1996.

A new display team, composed of two Lynx helicopters, was formed in 2001 and has been known as the Black Cats since 2004.

References

Naval aviation units and formations of the United Kingdom
Military units and formations established in 1975
Military units and formations disestablished in 1992
Sharks